Charles Billinghurst (July 27, 1818 – August 18, 1865) was a U.S. Representative from Wisconsin.

Born in Brighton, New York, Billinghurst attended the common schools.
He studied law, was admitted to the bar in 1847 and commenced practice in Rochester, New York.
He moved to Wisconsin the same year and settled in Juneau, Wisconsin, where he continued to practice law.

Billinghurst was elected as a member of the first Wisconsin State Assembly in 1848.
He was elected a presidential elector on the Democratic ticket in 1852.

Billinghurst was elected as an Opposition Party representative from Wisconsin's 3rd congressional district to the Thirty-fourth Congress, defeating incumbent Democrat John B. Macy; and as a Republican to the Thirty-fifth Congress (March 4, 1855 – March 3, 1859). He was an unsuccessful candidate for reelection in 1858 to the Thirty-sixth Congress, being defeated by Democrat Charles H. Larrabee.

He resumed the practice of law in Juneau, Wisconsin, where he died August 18, 1865. He was interred in Juneau Cemetery.

References

External links

1818 births
1865 deaths
People from Juneau, Wisconsin
People from Brighton, Franklin County, New York
Members of the Wisconsin State Assembly
Wisconsin lawyers
New York (state) lawyers
Wisconsin Democrats
Wisconsin Oppositionists
Opposition Party members of the United States House of Representatives
Republican Party members of the United States House of Representatives from Wisconsin
19th-century American politicians
19th-century American lawyers